Miguel Lamego Tavares (born 29 January 1999) is a Portuguese professional footballer who plays as a winger for  Panathinaikos B.

Career
He represented various clubs at the youth level, with Porto being the most notable. Tavares broke into senior football with União Nogueirense in 2018. In August 2022, Tavares joined Super League Greece 2 side Panathinaikos B on a one-year deal from Amarante.

On 7 November 2022, he made his professional debut starting in a 4–2 win over Apollon Larissa. He later suffered a hamstring injury that month.

References

External links

1999 births
Portuguese footballers
Association football wingers
Sportspeople from Vila Nova de Gaia
Amarante F.C. players
Panathinaikos F.C. B players
Super League Greece 2 players
Campeonato de Portugal (league) players
Portuguese expatriate footballers
Expatriate footballers in Greece
Portuguese expatriate sportspeople in Greece
Living people